Abdul Ghafoor Murad (born 12 March 1989) is a Qatari footballer. He currently plays as a defender.

Career
Apart from three loan spells, he played most of his career at Al Rayyan. He transferred to Al Ahli in July 2015.

References

External links
 QSL.com.qa profile
 Goalzz.com profile

1989 births
Living people
Qatari footballers
Al-Rayyan SC players
Al-Sailiya SC players
Qatar SC players
Mesaimeer SC players
Muaither SC players
Al Ahli SC (Doha) players
Qatar Stars League players
Qatari Second Division players
Association football defenders